Litopyllus temporarius is a spider in the family Gnaphosidae ("ground spiders"), in the infraorder Araneomorphae ("true spiders").
It is found in the USA.

References

Gnaphosidae
Spiders described in 1922